Malkin as a surname may refer to:

 Arthur Malkin (1803–1888), English writer, alpinist and cricketer
 Barry Malkin (1938–2019), American film editor
 Benjamin Heath Malkin (1769–1842), antiquary and author
 Chris Malkin (born 1967), English football player
 Eran Malkin (born 1993), Israeli footballer
 Evgeni Malkin (born 1986), Russian professional ice hockey player for the Pittsburgh Penguins of the NHL
 Felice Pazner Malkin (born 1929), Israeli artist
 Herbert Malkin (1836–1913), English lawyer and cricketer
 Herbert William Malkin (1883–1945), English lawyer, son of Herbert Malkin
 John Malkin (1921–1994), English football player for Stoke City
 Joseph Malkin (fl. 1920s, 1930s), English rugby league player
 Joseph Malkin (1879–1969), principal cellist for the Boston Symphony Orchestra, who founded the Malkin Conservatory in Boston in 1933
 Mary Ann O'Brian Malkin (1913–2005), collector of books on dance notation
 Michelle Malkin (born 1970), American political columnist, born Michelle Maglalang
 Myron Samuel Malkin (1924–1994), director of the NASA space shuttle program
 Peter Malkin (1927–2005), Israeli secret agent
 Peter L. Malkin (born 1928), American real estate investor
 Peter Malkin (cricketer) (born 1951), English cricketer
 Robert Malkin, engineer specializing in medical instrumentation for the developing world
 Russ Malkin, British film producer and director
 Scott D. Malkin (born 1959), American businessman
 Sivan Malkin Maas, Israeli ordained as a rabbi in Humanistic Judaism
 Tal Malkin (born 1970), Israeli-American cryptographer
 Terry Malkin (1935–2010), British speed skater
 Vitaly Malkin (born 1952), Russian-Israeli business oligarch and politician 
 William Harold Malkin (1868–1959), mayor of Vancouver, Canada
 Malkin Bowl, an outdoor theatre in Vancouver
 Yaakov Malkin (1926–2019), educator, literary critic, and Tel Aviv University academic

See also 
 Grimalkin, archaic term for a cat
 Malkin Tower (early 1600s, demolished), connected to witch trials in Lancashire, England
 "The Malkin Jewel", 2012 single by The Mars Volta

Related names
 Malka(h)
 Malkov, Malkoff (not )
 Małkowski
 Malkovich
 Malko

Russian-language surnames
Jewish surnames
Hebrew-language surnames
Matronymic surnames